John Paul Joseph Cadayona (born March 3, 1989), professionally known as Sef Cadayona, is a Filipino actor, host, comedian, and dancer. He is an alumnus of the fifth season of the Philippine reality talent show StarStruck.

Sef is called as the male Sheena Halili for portraying sidekick roles in various TV series. The series where he became a sidekick are Ilumina (2010) as the best friend of Aljur Abrenica, Time of My Life (2011) as the gay best friend of Kris Bernal, Alice Bungisngis and her Wonder Walis (2012) as the sidekick of Jean Garcia; in Together Forever as best friend of Julie Ann San Jose and in Mundo Mo'y Akin (2013) as the best friend of Alden Richards' role.

Aside from his sidekick roles, Sef also is getting attention because of his gay portrayals in several GMA Network shows.

Biography

Early life and career beginnings
Cadayona already made some TV appearances through the commercial of an ice cream brand that made a signature due to the weird scenarios on how to spend the 20 peso bill that is still on the air.

2009–10: StarStruck 
Cadayona made it to the final fourteen last November, 2009 with Steven Silva and Sarah Lahbati who got the Ultimate Survivor title for male and female, respectively.

He was considered as one of the threats for the boys because he was very active and he excelled in almost every tasks that were being given to them. During the dancing week given Douglas Nierras as the mentor, he gave 100% of his performance and had a chance to perform on stage paired with Nina Kodaka who finished 6th in the competition. However, during that week, he was included in the bottom group where Zeryl Lim went home.

In the following week, he was again included in the bottom group together with Princess Snell and the first timer by then, Rox Montealegre, where he was declared as the fourth avenger. He accepted his fate that time with humility. He said that what happened to him is just the beginning and just pray no matter what.

2010–present: Post StarStruck 
He signed a 5-year contract under GMA Artist Center together with other StarStruck V "avengers". Cadayona only wants simple things which are "great projects". He is sure that he will be taken care of and he knows that he is in good hands.

He may be one of the early evicted competitors in the said competition, but he still had a chance to be more active on television compared to some of his contemporaries. He was included in the musical variety show, Party Pilipinas, where the Final Five of StarStruck V were also included. He has also a hosting stint at Startalk together with Jan Manual and Chariz Solomon who are from the StarStruck's fourth season.

In early 2010, he already began to be an actor by having a guest role in the comedy series, Diva, as the rival of the character of the character of Mark Herras in a dance contest. He became also a guest for several episodes in the now defunct show, I Laugh Sabado wherein he portrayed different roles to show his comedic skills. In mid-2010, Sef had his first regular role through Ilumina which was shown in prime time.  The said show was led by Aljur Abrenica, Jackie Rice and Rhian Ramos.

In 2011, Cadayona was cast in the second episode of Spooky Nights series entitled "The Ring Tone". He portrayed the role of a gay character, Vanessa. Come mid-2011, he became part of the danceserye of GMA Network following the success of Diva - Time of My Life. In December 2011, Sef had his first film through the 2011 Metro Manila Film Festival and one of the most successful movie franchises of Regal Films. The film is Shake, Rattle & Roll 13.

In 2012, Cadayona was a part of the Bea Binene-starred TV series, Alice Bungisngis and her Wonder Walis, as Tomas, one of the assistants of Esmeralda (Jean Garcia). He also portrayed the supporting role of Jefferson Teodoro in the weekly teen-oriented series, Together Forever as Ely and Toyang's friend. During the last quarter of the year, he was a part of the Filipino adaptation of the hit Korean series, Coffee Prince, as Baldo, the ever loyal and overly submissive suitor of Andy's sister, Mylene.

Also in 2012 marked a milestone for Cadayona for his career in the silver-screen. He had four films in a year, including two from GMA Films (My Kontrabida Girl and Just One Summer). Sef also made two independent films, one is under the production of Cinema One entitled Slumber Party; his character was Jonel, a guy who wants to be in a frat and the part of his initiation was to sneak in a house. The other one was an entry in the New Wave Section of 2012 Metro Manila Film Festival with a title Gayak. He played a gay character, but unlike his previous gay roles which are of comic relief, his character in Gayak pleaded for sorrow and sympathy. Because of his performance in the said film, Golden Screen Awards for Movies awarded him the Breakthrough Performance by an Actor award.

In early 2013, he portrayed Wally Bayola's teenage years in Magpakailanman. Along with this, Cadayona became a regular cast member in the gag show Bubble Gang because of his comedic capabilities. Aside from his weekly Friday-night stint in Bubble Gang, He was also hired as the gay character Stefani via Vampire Ang Daddy Ko.

When Party Pilipinas was replaced by Sunday All Stars, Cadayona along with his fellow performers were carried over to join the cast. But since Sunday All Stars sets a different format compared to its predecessor, He belongs to the Tween Hearts team previously led by Jennylyn Mercado.

He appeared in Mundo Mo'y Akin, where he played Nonoy, who is the friend of Jerome (Alden Richards), who also works in the resort owned by the Carbonels. Nonoy knows about the special relationship between Jerome Alvarez and Darlene Carbonel (Lauren Young) and soon notices Marilyn Mendoza's (Louise de los Reyes) feelings for his friend. Nonoy has a biting and sarcastic wit, serving as somewhat of a comic relief throughout the series. Because of this, having four regular shows, Sef is one of the busiest actors of the network nowadays.

So far, He has one film for 2013, and that is the Marian Rivera - Richard Gutierrez-starred film, My Lady Boss, under GMA Films and Regal Entertainment.

Education
He was a grade-school graduate of Marist School in Marikina. He finished high school in Divine Light Academy in Las Piñas.

Cadayona sacrificed his studies of Media Arts in San Beda Alabang to join StarStruck.

Filmography

Television

Films

TV Specials
StarStruck Season 5 Finals Night (GMA 7)
Bubble Gang 15th Anniversary Special (GMA 7, 2009)
Lucky' 09: The 2009 GMA New Year's Countdown (December 2008-January 2009)
GMA @ 60: The GMA 60th Anniversary TV Special (GMA 7, 2010)
Prosperity In 2010: The 2010 GMA New Year's Countdown (GMA 7, December 2009-January 2010)
2010 To '11: The GMA New Year Countdown (GMA 7, December 2010-January 2011)
Countdown to 2012: The GMA New Year Special (GMA 7, December 2011-January 2012)
Party Pilipinas Anniversary Special (GMA 7, 2011-2013)
27th PMPC Star Awards For TV (ABS-CBN 2, 2013) - Cameo (Sef's 1st ABS-CBN 2 Appearance)
Win Na Win Sa 2013: The GMA New Year Countdown (GMA 7, December 2012-January 2013)
Sunday All Stars Anniversary Special (GMA 7, 2013-2015)
28th PMPC Star Awards For TV (ABS-CBN 2, 2014) - Cameo
Countdown To 2014: The GMA New Year Special (GMA 7, December 2013-January 2014)
Countdown To 2015: The GMA New Year Special (GMA 7, December 2014 -January 2015)
Thank You Kapuso: GMA Fans Day 2015: The GMA 65th Anniversary TV Special (GMA 7, July 2015)
IMBG 20: Bubble Gang 20th Anniversary Documentary Special - (GMA 7, November 2015)
21 Gang Salute: Bubble Gang 21st Anniversary Documentary Special - (GMA 7, November 2016)
Countdown to 2016: The GMA New Year Special (GMA 7, December 2015-January 2016)
The Magic Of Christmas: The 2016 GMA Christmas Special - (GMA 7, December 2016)
Lipad Sa 2017: The 2017 GMA New Year Countdown Special - (GMA 7, December 2016,January 2017)
Bubble Gang Parokya Bente Dos: Bubble Gang 22nd Anniversary Stage Musical Play Special - (GMA 7, November 2017)

Awards and nominations

See also
 Megan Young
 Johan Santos
 Jan Manual
 Chariz Solomon

External links
Sef Cadayona at GMANetwork.com

References

1989 births
Living people
21st-century Filipino male actors
Filipino male television actors
Filipino male comedians
Participants in Philippine reality television series
StarStruck (Philippine TV series) participants
GMA Network personalities
Filipino male child actors
People from Las Piñas
Male actors from Metro Manila
Tagalog people